Below are the rosters for the 2010 Toulon Tournament.

Group A

Head coach: Alain Gouamene

Head coach: Patrick Gonfalone

Head coach: Eduardo Lara Lozano

Head coach: Akihiro Nishimura

Group B

Head coach:  César Vaccia

Head coach: Keld Bordinggaard

Head coach: Jacobus Adriaanse

GK Saad Abdulla Al-Sheeb Al-Sadd Qatar
GK Muhannad Naim Hussain Al-Sadd Qatar
FW Ali Hassan Afif Al-Sadd Qatar
FW Hassan Khaled Al Haydos Al-Sadd Qatar
MF Mohammed Al Yazidi Al-Sadd Qatar
MF Abdulkareem Al-Ali Al-Rayyan SC Qatar
DF Khaled Abulraaof Al Zerequi Al-Saad Qatar
FW Moayad Hassan Al-Gharafa Qatar
DF Murad Naji Kamal Hussein Al-Rayyan Qatar
DF Khalid Muftah Mayuuf Al-Wakrah Qatar
DF Al-Mahdi Ali Mukhtar Al-Sadd Qatar
MF Nasser Saad Nabil Saleem Al-Sadd Qatar
MF Fadhi Said Omar Qatar SC Qatar
DF Abdul Ghafoor Murad Al-Rayyan Qatar
DF Hamood Al-Yazidi Al-Sadd Qatar
FW Abdulaziz Al-Anzari Al-Sadd Qatar
DF Ziad Mohammed Al-Khatib Al-Arabi Qatar
MF Hamad Al-Obeidi Al-Rayyan SC Qatar
DF Tahir Zakaria Muhammad Al-Sadd Qatar
MF Abdelaziz Hatem Mohammed Abdullah Al-Arabi SC Qatar

Head coach Igor Kolyvanov

Footnotes

Squads
Toulon Tournament squads